The Arab Basketball Championship for Men or simply ABC is a regional basketball tournament which takes place every two years between men's national teams of the members of the Arab Basketball Confederation, representing the Arab world.

The 24th edition scheduled in the UAE will take place from 9 to 16 February 2022. The countries that intend to participate are: UAE, Egypt, Saudi Arabia, Bahrain, Jordan, Syria, Tunisia, Algeria, Yemen, Libya, Lebanon and Qatar.

Statistics

Winners

Titles by team

All-time medal table

 Share bronze medals at 1999 and 2007.

Participation details

Legends

  – Champions
  – Runner-up
  – Third place
  – Fourth place
  – Semi-finals
  — Knockout quarterfinals (2009–present)

  — Second round group (1974–2009)
 WD — Withdrew
 • — Did not qualify
 × — Did not enter / disqualified
  — Hosts

See also
Basketball at the Pan Arab Games
Arab U18 Basketball Championship

References

External links
Arab teams Basketball Championship - Goalzz.com
Official website (in Arabic)

 
Basketball
Basketball competitions in Africa between national teams
Basketball competitions in Asia between national teams